Snow Island is an island in Ontario, Canada, located in Lake Erie north of Long Point.  The island has never been inhabited, and is located southeast of both Ryerson's Island and Second Island, which together with Snow Island are three of the more notable islands near Long Point.

References

Islands of Lake Erie in Ontario